Philip Andrew Pringle OAM (born 21 May 1952) is a New Zealand-born Australian Christian evangelist. Pringle arrived in Sydney, New South Wales, from Christchurch in 1980 with his wife Chris. He is the senior pastor of C3 Church Sydney (formerly known as Christian City Church), which was started in a surf club in Dee Why before moving to a large, rented warehouse, after an initial attempt at planting a church in the Sydney suburb of Roseville.
He is the founder of C3 Church Global, a church planting movement. He is also the founder and president of Oxford Falls Grammar School, Sydney.

Pringle ministers to and occasionally preaches in City Harvest Church in Singapore where he is considered to be an advisory pastor and a long-time friend and mentor of that organisation's leader, Kong Hee. Pringle is a member of the board of directors of Dr Yongii Cho's organisation "Church Growth International."

Bibliography

See also
 David Yonggi Cho
 Charismatic movement

References

External links

 C3 Church, Oxford Falls

1952 births
Australian Pentecostal pastors
Australian Pentecostals
Ilam School of Fine Arts alumni
Living people
Pentecostal writers
Recipients of the Medal of the Order of Australia